Santa Anita Oaks is an American Grade II Thoroughbred horse race held annually in early April at Santa Anita Park in Arcadia, California. Open to three-year-old fillies willing to race 8.5 furlongs ( miles) on the dirt. The race is a Grade II event with a current purse of $200,000 and has been a prep race to the Triple Tiara of Thoroughbred Racing, including the Kentucky Oaks, the Black-Eyed Susan Stakes and Mother Goose Stakes.

Inaugurated in 1935 as a race for two-year-olds, it originated as the Santa Susana Stakes. In 1952 the race became the Santa Susana Handicap then in 1958 reverted to the Santa Susana Stakes. In 1986 it was given its current designation as the Santa Anita Oaks. In 2020 the event was downgraded to Grade II.

Since inception, the race has been set at various distances:
1935 : 3 furlongs
 1937 - 1938 : 6 furlongs
 1939 - 1951 & 1956 : 7 furlongs
1954 & 1957 : 8 furlongs
1957 – present : 8.5 furlongs

Records
Stakes Record
 Turbulent Descent (1:41.05) - Current Distance of 8.5 furlongs

Most wins by a jockey:
 Bill Shoemaker - 10
 Donald R. Pierce - 5
 Gary Stevens won four in a row, 1987–1990

Most wins by a trainer:
 D. Wayne Lukas - 8
 Charles E. Whittingham - 4

Winners of the Santa Anita Oaks since 1975

Earlier winners

 1974 - Miss Musket
 1973 - Belle Marie
 1972 - Susan's Girl
 1971 - Turkish Trousers
 1970 - Opening Bid
 1969 - Dumptys Lady
 1968 - Allie's Serenade
 1967 - Fish House
 1966 - Spearfish
 1965 - Desert Love
 1964 - Blue Norther
 1963 - Lamb Chop
 1962 - Pixie Erin
 1961 - Fun House
 1960 - Darling June
 1959 - Silver Spoon
 1958 - Penumbra
 1957 - Market Basket
 1956 - Dupatta
 1955 - No race
 1954 - Quillo Maid
 1953 - Femme Fatale
 1952 - Season's Best
 1951 - Ruth Lily †
 1950 - Special Touch
 1949 - Gaffery
 1948 - Mrs. Rabbit
 1947 - Hubble Bubble
 1946 - Enfilade
 1945 - Busher
 1941 - Cute Trick
 1940 - Augury
 1939 - Sweet Nancy
 1938 - Minulus
 1937 - Patty Cake
 1936 - No race
 1935 - Dunlin Lady

† In 1951, Sweet Talk won the race but was disqualified and placed third.

See also

Road to the Kentucky Oaks

Horse races in California
Santa Anita Park
Flat horse races for three-year-old fillies
Grade 1 stakes races in the United States
Graded stakes races in the United States
Recurring sporting events established in 1935